The following is a list compiling the total number of career victories in open wheel American Championship car racing. The list recognizes "Indy car" or "Champ car" victories under the following auspices:
 American Automobile Association Contest Board (1905, 1916, and 1920–1955)
 United States Automobile Club (1956–1997)
 Championship Auto Racing Teams (1979–2007)
 Indy Racing League/IndyCar Series (1996–present)

Sanctioning bodies

The AAA Contest Board began sanctioning races as early as 1904. In the early years of the sport, only two seasons (1905 and 1916) an official national championship was recognized and awarded. Individual events from 1904, 1906–1915, and 1917–1919 are specifically excluded from the table below, due to the fact that they were not part of an official "championship" season.

The national championship was re-instated by AAA for 1920 and beyond. Retroactively awarded titles for the other years were later researched, although most historians consider them to be revisionist, and do not deem them as suitable for official record. All racing was suspended from 1942 to 1945, due to WWII. The 1946 season is a source of a statistical anomaly. The AAA Contest Board included a substantial number of "Big Car" races in the national championship for 1946, swelling the season to 77 events (6 Champ Car races and 71 Big Car races). Some later texts chose to dismiss the 71 Big Car races from record, but reliable records and historians contend that the season should be regarded as the full 77-race schedule.

Note that victories in the Indianapolis 500 from 1979 to 1995 are listed under the heading of USAC. While CART sanctioned the primary year-long season of races, the Indianapolis 500 itself remained under the sanctioning of USAC.

For 1996–1997, victories in the Indianapolis 500 and Indy Racing League are listed solely under the heading of IndyCar. For the first nine races of its existence (five in 1996 and four in 1997), the Indy Racing League fell under the sanctioning umbrella of USAC. After two controversial races in early 1997, sanctioning abruptly switched to in-house oversight by the IRL. In 2010, the series retired the term "IRL" in favor of "IndyCar."

Non-points races such as the Race of Two Worlds, Marlboro Challenge, and the 2008 Nikon Indy 300 are not reflected in the totals below.

National Championships chart
 Results current through the 2022 IndyCar Series season.

Notes
 The retroactively-awarded (unofficial) champions published by Haresnape & Means, and later Russ Catlin, are not reflected in the totals.
 Winners of the largely ceremonial USAC Gold Crown Championship (awarded from 1981 to 1995) are not included. During that period, the CART series conducted the national championship. Except for a dwindling "rump" period from 1980 to 1982, the Gold Crown title consisted of only the Indianapolis 500. Therefore, the Indy 500 winner was the de facto Gold Crown champion.
 Due to sanctioning body splits in the sport of American Open Wheel racing from 1979 to 2007, several years saw two separate champions awarded for separately sanctioned championship circuits. It is reflected in the table for 1979, and 1996–2007.
 Buzz Calkins and Scott Sharp tied for the three-race 1996 Indy Racing League championship. No rule existed to provide for a tiebreaker, and the two were declared co-champions.

Race wins chart
 Results current through the 2023 Firestone Grand Prix of St. Petersburg.
 Indicates active driver.

Winners of non-championship events
A substantial number of non-championship races were sanctioned by the AAA Contest Board, namely from the periods from 1902–1904, 1906–1915, and 1917–1920. That includes the Indianapolis 500 in 1911, 1912, 1913, 1914, 1915, and 1919. Various other non-championship races have been conducted over the years by AAA, USAC, CART, and IRL from 1920–2008. The winners from those races are specifically not included in the main table above. Below is an abridged list of race winners from non-championship AAA races.

 Ralph DePalma (19)
 Bob Burman (6)
 Hughie Hughes (4)
 Ray Harroun (4)
 Louis Disbrow (4)
 Gil Andersen (3)
 Bert Dingley (3)
 Eddie O'Donnell (3)
 Charlie Merz (3)
 Cliff Durant (3)
 Teddy Tetzlaff (3)
 Bill Endicott (3)
 Tom Alley (2)
 Joe Dawson (2)
 Harry Grant (2)
 George Robertson (2)
 Tom Kincaid (2)
 Harvey Herrick (2)
 Frank Lescault (1)
 Eaton McMillan (1)
 Howard Covey (1)
 Frank Gelnaw (1)
 Charles Bigelow (1)
 George Joerimann (1)
 Dave Buck (1)
 William Sharp (1)
 Charlie Arnold (1)
 Joe Matson (1)
 Bruce Keen (1)
 Armour Ferguson (1)
 Jules Goux (1)
 William Taylor (1)
 David L. Bruce-Brown (1)
 George Hill (1)
 Willie Knipper (1)
 Jack Fleming (1)
 Arthur See (1)
 Len Zengel (1)
 Louis Nikrent (1)
 Ira Vail (1)
 William Carlson (1)
 Spencer Wishart (1)
 Al Livingstone (1)
 Joe Nikrent (1)
 Don Herr (1)
 Erwin Bergdoll (1)
 Herbert Lytle (1)
 Glover Ruckstell (1)
 Johnny Jenkins (1)
 Harris Hanshue (1)
 Leigh Lynch (1)
 Pete Henderson (1)
 Mortimer Roberts (1)
 Lewis Strang (1)
 René Thomas (1)

Notes
 The USAC Race of Two Worlds was considered a non-championship event. Likewise, the 1966 event at Fuji was a non-championship event. In some seasons, the Pikes Peak International Hill Climb was a championship event, and in some seasons it was not.
 CART conducted the Marlboro Challenge all-star race from 1987–1992. This was considered a non-championship event.
 Two INDYCAR races were abandoned as they were stopped before the legal definition of an official race by the sanctioning body, half distance plus one lap, unlike the FIA Code, which requires three green flag laps to be conducted for an official race.  The 1999 IRL VisionAire 500K at Charlotte Motor Speedway was cancelled after 79 laps, and struck from record, with no winner officially declared following a Lap 62 crash where a tire went into the grandstand, killing three spectators. Buddy Lazier was leading at the time of the Lap 61 caution, while Greg Ray was leading at the formal race abandonment after Lap 79.  The 2011 IZOD IndyCar World Championship at Las Vegas Motor Speedway was halted and formally abandoned after 11 laps as a result of a multiple-car crash that involved the death of Dan Wheldon, with Tony Kanaan leading. Therefore, the total number of IRL/IndyCar races reflected in the chart is two fewer than the number of actual events. Both races are recognised as "cancelled events" with the box scores listed based on standings at the time of abandonment on Racing Reference.
 In the aftermath of the open wheel unification in early 2008, due to a scheduling conflict, the 2008 Long Beach Grand Prix was contested with former Champ Car teams and chassis. It was uniquely regarded as the "final" Champ Car race. However, it was officially contested under IndyCar sanction, awarded points towards the IndyCar championship, and race winner Will Power is credited with an IndyCar victory to his credit from the event. Furthermore, the Nikon Indy 300 was included on the 2008 schedule as a non-points exhibition race. Therefore, race winner Ryan Briscoe was not credited with an official victory for that event.
 In 1952, another open wheel series was formed alongside the AAA, the NASCAR Speedway Division. Only one full season, along with a second partial season, was held, and the division folded after only ten points races. Of the ten race winners, none of the drivers (seven total) managed to win any races under AAA or USAC sanctioning.

Race wins at different tracks
This is an overview of which drivers have achieved a win on which race track. Only the number of different racetracks is displayed. Several victories on a particular track are not highlighted. The number of wins per driver is therefore smaller than the total number of career victories.

Paved Ovals

Permanent Road Courses

Temporary Street Courses

Notes

Race wins by nationality
 All figures current through the 2023 Firestone Grand Prix of St. Petersburg.

Race wins by teams
Total all-time victories for Indy car teams (selected teams & active teams). All figures current through the 2023 Firestone Grand Prix of St. Petersburg.
 Team Penske: 231
 Chip Ganassi Racing: 124
 Newman/Haas Racing: 107
 Andretti Autosport: 70
 Vel's Parnelli Jones Racing: 53
 All American Racers: 51
 Patrick Racing: 42
 A. J. Foyt Enterprises: 38
 Forsythe/Pettit Racing: 37
 Rahal Letterman Lanigan Racing: 29
 Team Green: 23
 Galles Racing: 21
 Truesports: 18
 Panther Racing: 15
 Arrow McLaren SP: 11
 Team Menard: 10
 Hemelgarn Racing: 8
 Shierson Racing: 7
 KV Racing Technology: 7
 Dale Coyne Racing: 6
 Ed Carpenter Racing: 6
 CFH Racing: 2
 Harding Steinbrenner Racing: 2
 Dreyer & Reinbold Racing: 1
 Bryan Herta Autosport: 1
 Sarah Fisher Hartman Racing: 1
 Meyer Shank Racing: 1

External links
 IndyCar.com – Official site
 ChampCarStats.com

See also
 List of Indianapolis 500 winners
 List of all-time NASCAR Cup Series winners
 List of Formula One Grand Prix winners

 
 
Winners
American Championship Car winners
American